John Abbott (25 May 1943 – December 2002) was an English professional footballer who played in the Football League for Crewe Alexandra as a centre-half.

References

External links
Profile at ENFA

1943 births
2002 deaths
People from Winsford
English footballers
Association football defenders
Winsford United F.C. players
Crewe Alexandra F.C. players
Oswestry Town F.C. players
English Football League players
Footballers from Cheshire